The fourth full elections for Guildford Borough Council took place on 5 May 1983.  The Conservatives retained control of the council winning 31 of the 45 seats on the council, this represented a net loss of three seats compared to the 1979 elections.  The SDP-Liberal Alliance won 7 seats, a net gain of 4 seats compared to the 1979 council elections.  Labour retained its 6 seats.  Only 1 Independent was elected, one fewer than 1979.

If one disregards any change of seats from the Liberal Party to the SDP-Liberal Alliance, three wards wholly or partly changed party allegiance in the 1983 council election relative to the 1979 council election.

The SDP-Liberal Alliance gained a total of four councillors over two wards.  They gained two councillors from the Conservatives in Friary & St Nicolas ward and gained a further two councillors from the Conservatives in Onslow ward.

The Conservatives gained one councillor from an independent in Lovelace ward.

Results

References

1983
1983 English local elections
1980s in Surrey